El Inferno is the fifth studio album by the Spanish alternative metal band Hamlet. Musically it resembles Insomnio, but lacks the hardcore elements from previous albums. Also, the lyrics are more introspective.

Track listing
 El mejor amigo de nadie
 Vivir es una ilusión
 ¿Por qué?
 Buena suerte
 No soy igual
 Miserable
 Perdóname
 Denuncio a Dios
 No me arrepiento
 Mi nombre es yo
 Lárgate despacio

Members 
J. Molly - Vocals
Luis Tárraga - Lead guitar
Pedro Sánchez - Rhythm guitar
Augusto Hernández - Bass, chorus
Paco Sánchez - Drums

Sources 
Info of the album
Info in zona-zero.net

2000 albums
Hamlet (band) albums